David Ernest Buffett AM (born 17 October 1942) is a political figure from the Australian territory of Norfolk Island. He served as Chief Minister of Norfolk Island from March 2010 to March 2013; he has also held the position three previous occasions. He is the longest-serving member of the Norfolk Legislative Assembly, having served on every Assembly (except one) since it was established in 1979.

Chief Minister of Norfolk Island

Buffett was Chief Minister of Norfolk Island,  from 24 March 2010 – 20 March 2013, and previously from 2 June 2006, when he succeeded Geoffrey Robert Gardner, to 28 March 2007, when he was succeeded by Andre Nobbs, having lost his parliamentary seat in the general election held on 21 March. (He polled only 355 votes out of 9720 and finished 11th out of 17 candidates for Norfolk's single nine-member constituency).

Buffett had previously held the post of Chief Minister of the territory from 1979 to 1986, and a roughly equivalent title of President of the Legislative Assembly from 1989 to 1992.

Speaker of the Norfolk Legislative Assembly

Buffet was elected Speaker of the Norfolk Legislative Assembly on 20 March 2013

He has previously served as Speaker from 1994–1997 and 2000–2006.

See also
 Politics of Norfolk Island

References

Living people
Heads of government of Norfolk Island
Members of the Norfolk Legislative Assembly
Members of the Order of Australia
1942 births